Translated Accounts is a novel by the Scottish writer James Kelman published in 2001 by Secker & Warburg.

Critical reception
The reviewer for The Observer wrote: "This novel marks a change of direction for Kelman, in that it shifts away from his immediate locality to stake out an unnamed, almost abstract terrain; the linguistic power struggle remains a constant, however. ...This book has been seven years in the writing, and you are made to feel the weight of that work in almost every line."

References

2001 British novels
Scottish novels
Novels by James Kelman
Secker & Warburg books